UDP-3-O-acyl-N-acetylglucosamine deacetylase (LpxC protein, LpxC enzyme, LpxC deacetylase, deacetylase LpxC, UDP-3-O-acyl-GlcNAc deacetylase, UDP-3-O-((R)-3-hydroxymyristoyl)-N-acetylglucosamine deacetylase, UDP-(3-O-acyl)-N-acetylglucosamine deacetylase, UDP-3-O-(R-3-hydroxymyristoyl)-N-acetylglucosamine deacetylase, UDP-(3-O-(R-3-hydroxymyristoyl))-N-acetylglucosamine deacetylase) is an enzyme with systematic name UDP-3-O-((3R)-3-hydroxymyristoyl)-N-acetylglucosamine amidohydrolase. This enzyme catalyses the following chemical reaction

 UDP-3-O-[(3R)-3-hydroxymyristoyl]-N-acetylglucosamine + H2O  UDP-3-O-[(3R)-3-hydroxymyristoyl]-D-glucosamine + acetate

This zinc protein participates in biosynthesis of lipid A.

References

External links 
 

EC 3.5.1